Seoul Racecourse Park Station is a station on Line 4 of the Seoul Subway. Its current name was given in 2000, before that it was called Gyeongmajang-yeok (경마장역, 競馬場驛). True to its name, it is located near LetsRun Park Seoul, a horse racing venue. It attracts large volumes of people, particularly on weekends when thousands of Seoulites flock to the races to bet on their favorite horses. This is apparent in the significant difference between the weekday and weekend passenger usage of this station.

The Golf Recreation Park is also accessible via Seoul Racecourse Park Station.

Station layout

Passengers

References

Metro stations in Gwacheon
Seoul Metropolitan Subway stations
Railway stations opened in 1994